Roman Mykolayovych Miroshnyk (born 3 January 1994) is a Ukrainian professional football defender who plays for FK Panevėžys.

External links
 
 
Club profile
FPL profile

1994 births
Living people
Footballers from Luhansk
Ukrainian footballers
Ukraine youth international footballers
Association football defenders
FC Stal Alchevsk players
FC Metalurh Donetsk players
FC Kramatorsk players
NK Veres Rivne players
Ukrainian Premier League players
Ukrainian First League players
Ukrainian Second League players